Pratap Singh (2 December 1764 – 1 August 1803) was a Kachwaha ruler of Jaipur. He is known for constructing the Hawa Mahal.

Biography
Pratap was born as a younger son of Madho Singh I on 2 December 1764 . Pratap Singh became the Maharaja at the age of 14 after the death of his brother Prithvi Singh. He ruled from 1778 to 1803.  His 25-year rule witnessed many spectacular achievements and strategic failures.  Being constantly goaded by the Marathas and the Mughals, he had to face repeated threats and a heavy drainage of funds.

The fountains behind the Govind Dev temple are credited to him, his poetic talent and patronage of arts and crafts. During his time, the art of paintings reached its peak.  By the time of his ascension to the throne, the Mughal Empire was almost in shambles and the artists were fleeing Delhi. Pratap Singh gave them patronage and they came and settled in Jaipur.  It was these artists who brought recognition to the Jaipuri school of painting.

The finest example of his connoisseurship is the unique monument of Hawa Mahal (the palace of the Winds) and few rooms of City Palace, which he got constructed.  A large number of scholarly works were produced during his time.  He himself was a good poet and wrote poems in Braj Bhasha and Dhundari language under the pen name of Brijnidhi.

See also
House of Kachwaha
Hawa Mahal

References

Pratap
1764 births
1803 deaths